The Roman Catholic Diocese of Leribe is a diocese located in the city of Leribe in the Ecclesiastical province of Maseru in Lesotho.

History
 December 11, 1952: Established as Diocese of Leribe from the Diocese of Maseru

Leadership
 Bishops of Leribe (Latin Church)
 Bishop Emanuel Mabathoana (1952.12.11 – 1961.01.03), appointed Archbishop of Maseru
 Bishop Ignatius Phakoe (1961.01.03 – 1968.06.18)
 Bishop Paul Khoarai (1970.03.07 – 2009.06.30)
 Bishop Augustine Tumaole Bane (since 2009.09.19)

Sources
 GCatholic.org
 Catholic Hierarchy

Leribe
Christian organizations established in 1952
Roman Catholic dioceses and prelatures established in the 20th century
1952 establishments in Basutoland
Roman Catholic Ecclesiastical Province of Maseru